Dávid Ivan (born 26 February 1995) is a Slovak professional footballer who plays as a midfielder for Dinamo Tirana.

Club career

Sampdoria
Ivan made his professional debut for Sampdoria against Carpi, on 23 August 2015. He was sent off for a second yellow card in the 81st minute of the match, though Sampdoria defeated Carpi 5–2 in the first match of the 2015–16 Serie A season.

He scored his first goal on 20 December 2015 against Palermo in the 76th minute with a one time chipped volley.

On 17 August 2018, Ivan joined to Vis Pesaro on loan until 30 June 2019.

Chievo
On 3 July 2019, Ivan signed with Serie B club Chievo Verona.

References

External links
 Futbalnet profile
 U.C. Sampdoria official club profile
 
 

1995 births
Living people
Footballers from Bratislava
Slovak footballers
Slovakia under-21 international footballers
Slovakia youth international footballers
Association football midfielders
U.C. Sampdoria players
S.S.C. Bari players
F.C. Pro Vercelli 1892 players
Vis Pesaro dal 1898 players
A.C. ChievoVerona players
FC Dynamo Brest players
FK Dinamo Tirana players
Serie A players
Serie B players
Belarusian Premier League players
Slovak expatriate footballers
Slovak expatriate sportspeople in Italy
Expatriate footballers in Italy
Slovak expatriate sportspeople in Belarus
Expatriate footballers in Belarus
Expatriate footballers in Albania